Phayong Khunnaen is a Thai association football manager.

Managerial statistics

Honours
Manager

Thailand under-16/17
  2007 AFF U-17 Youth Championship; Winners
  2015 AFF U-16 Youth Championship; Winners

References

External links 
 Phayong Khunnaen Profile

Living people
Phayong Khunnaen
Phayong Khunnaen
Phayong Khunnaen
1967 births